Granville Summit is an unincorporated community in Bradford County, Pennsylvania, United States. Granville Summit has a post office with ZIP code 16926.

References

Unincorporated communities in Bradford County, Pennsylvania
Unincorporated communities in Pennsylvania